Cruz de Pau is a locality in the parish of Amora, in the municipality of Seixal in Portugal. It is part of the Lisbon metropolitan area. It is served by the suburban train Fertagus station of Foros de Amora and the bus company TST, Transportes Sul do Tejo that links the locality both to Lisbon (15mins) and Setúbal (35mins) city centres.

Populated places in Setúbal District
Seixal